Weissert is an unincorporated community in Custer County, Nebraska, United States.

History
The first post office in Weissert was established in 1892.

References

Populated places in Custer County, Nebraska
Unincorporated communities in Nebraska